Zelkova sinica, the Chinese zelkova, is a species of flowering plant in the family Ulmaceae, native to central and southeastern China. A well-known landscaping tree in China, it is also used as a street tree in a number of cities in Europe and the United States.

References

sinica
Trees of China
Endemic flora of China
Flora of North-Central China
Flora of South-Central China
Flora of Southeast China
Plants described in 1916